List of ABC shows may refer to:

 List of Australian Broadcasting Corporation programs
 List of programs broadcast by American Broadcasting Company
 List of programs broadcast by Associated Broadcasting Company